Hofstetten may refer to the following places: 

in Austria:
Hofstetten-Grünau
in Germany:
Hofstetten, Bavaria, in the district of Landsberg
Hofstetten, Baden-Württemberg, in the Ortenau district 
in Switzerland:
Hofstetten bei Brienz, in the canton of Berne
Hofstetten, Zürich, in the canton of Zürich
Hofstetten-Flüh, in the canton of Solothurn